Only a Woman may refer to:

 Only a Woman (1941 film), Swedish film
 Only a Woman (1962 film), German film
 "Only a Woman" (song) by Matt Lang